The 1938–39 Sheffield Shield season was the 43rd season of the Sheffield Shield, the domestic first-class cricket competition of Australia. South Australia won the championship.

Table

Statistics

Most Runs
Bill Brown 990

Most Wickets
Clarrie Grimmett 27

References

Sheffield Shield
Sheffield Shield
Sheffield Shield seasons